= Zombie title =

A zombie title is a real estate title that has stayed with the owner of a residential property after the mortgage lender has begun a foreclosure process (making the owner move out to enable sale of the property) but then cancelled the foreclosure process. The lender is not required to notify the owner of the cancellation, who is therefore often unaware of the obligations associated with continued ownership, such as payment of local taxes and upkeep of the property in accordance with local bylaws. The prevalence of zombie titles greatly increased in the United States following the 2008 financial crisis.
